Jesper Sellgren (born June 11, 1998) is a Swedish professional ice hockey defenceman currently playing for Luleå HF of the Swedish Hockey League (SHL). Sellgren was selected in the sixth round, 166th overall, of the 2018 NHL Entry Draft by the Carolina Hurricanes.

Playing career
Following the conclusion of the 2017–18 season, his second Allsvenskan season, Sellgren left his hometown team to sign a two-year contract with Luleå HF on March 28, 2018. During the 2018 NHL Entry Draft, Sellgren was selected in the sixth round, 166th overall, by the Carolina Hurricanes.

With Luleå HF during the 2018–19 season, Sellgren recorded 15 points in 52 games. At the conclusion of Luleå's season, Sellgren signed a professional tryout (PTO) with the Hurricanes' American Hockey League (AHL) affiliate, the Charlotte Checkers. On 28 May 2019, the Hurricanes signed Sellgren to a three-year, entry-level contract.

Approaching the 2020–21 season, with the North American leagues delayed due to the COVID-19 pandemic, Sellgren continued his SHL career in Sweden, moving to Frölunda HC on loan from the Hurricanes on 31 July 2020.

After helping the Chicago Wolves claim the Calder Cup, his second with an Hurricanes affiliate, Sellgren as an impending restricted free agent was signed to a three-year contract to return to his original SHL club, Luleå HF, on 1 July 2022.

Career statistics

Regular season and playoffs

International

Awards and honours

References

External links
 

1998 births
Living people
Carolina Hurricanes draft picks
Charlotte Checkers (2010–) players
Chicago Wolves players
Frölunda HC players
Luleå HF players
Modo Hockey players
People from Örnsköldsvik Municipality
Swedish ice hockey defencemen
Sportspeople from Västernorrland County